Eric William Kaler (born 1956) is a chemical engineer, professor, and university administrator. He currently serves as president of Case Western Reserve University, a position he began in 2021.

From 2011 to 2019, Kaler was president of the University of Minnesota. He returned to scientific research and teaching in the university's Department of Chemical Engineering in January 2021. Before coming to Minnesota, Kaler served from 2007 to 2011 as provost and senior vice president for academic affairs and vice president for Brookhaven affairs at Stony Brook University, New York. In the latter role he oversaw interactions with Brookhaven National Laboratory, which Stony Brook University co-manages with Battelle Memorial Institute.

Early life and education 
Kaler was born in Burlington, Vermont, in 1956 as an only child in a military family that moved around a lot while his father served as a noncommissioned officer in the United States Air Force.

Kaler received his B.S. (1978) from California Institute of Technology and his Ph.D. in chemical engineering (1982) from the University of Minnesota under the direction of H. Ted Davis and L. E. Scriven.

Career 
He was an assistant professor (1982–87) and associate professor (1987–89) of chemical engineering at the University of Washington in Seattle. He joined the chemical engineering faculty of the University of Delaware in 1989 and was promoted to professor in 1991. He was named the Elizabeth Inez Kelley professor of chemical engineering in 1998, and was chair of the chemical engineering department from 1996 to 2000. He served as dean of the College of Engineering at the University of Delaware from 2000 to 2007 before moving on to Stony Brook to become Provost. He was a visiting professor at the University of Graz, Austria in 1995.

Presidency of University of Minnesota (2011 - 2019)

When Eric Kaler took office on July 1, 2011, he became only the second alumnus to rise to the position of University of Minnesota president.

Priorities and initiatives 
In his first year on the job, Kaler emphasized his commitment to academic excellence and rigor by investing in new faculty positions. He stressed the importance of the university's groundbreaking research enterprise. He led a campaign to contain costs and operate the university more efficiently and effectively, with the goal of freeing up resources for the university's core teaching, research, and public engagement and service mission.

He acted on a pledge to keep the university accessible to students of all economic backgrounds by increasing financial aid and limiting the university's 2012 tuition increase to the smallest this century.

In his second academic year, Kaler and the university, in partnership with the Minnesota Legislature, froze tuition for Minnesota-resident students. He proposed a set of innovative tax and tuition relief initiatives to aid students, their families, and donors, and also proposed performance measures that the university must meet to gain some of its state support.
The State of Minnesota also invested in a new research program known as MnDRIVE, in the amount of about $18 million per year. MnDRIVE in its first funding cycle, was focused on research around clean water, robotics, neuroscience, and food.
That request was expected to be heard by the DFL Party controlled Minnesota Legislature and Governor Mark Dayton during its 2013 session.
Kaler's outreach to the Minnesota business community has earned him and the university recognition by the U.S. Department of Commerce and the White House.

In 2012, Secretary of Homeland Security Janet Napolitano named Kaler to the U.S. Department of Homeland Security Academic Advisory Council.

Challenges and controversies 
Kaler was appointed President of the University of Minnesota after Robert Bruininks during a period of decreased funding from the state legislature to the University of Minnesota. During his first year in office the state legislature reduced appropriations to higher education down to a level that were equivalent to the funding amounts from 1998.

In 2012, the Minnesota Daily, the university student newspaper, criticized the university athletic department, under then-Athletic Director Norwood Teague, for deciding to spend $800,000 to reschedule a football game with North Carolina to increase the football team's rankings.

The University of Minnesota was profiled by The Wall Street Journal in an analysis of higher education spending and mismanagement. According to the article, the University of Minnesota salary and employment records from 2001 through the spring of 2012 show that the university system added more than 1,000 administrators over that period. Their ranks grew 37%, more than twice as fast as the teaching corps and nearly twice as fast as the student body, the Journal reported. Growing under previous president Robert Bruininks, the Journal reported that under Kaler the University of Minnesota has the largest share of employees classified as "executive and managerial" among the nation's 72 "very-high-research" public universities in the 2011–12 academic year.

In the wake of The Wall Street Journal story and a commentary in The Washington Post (that was reprinted in the Minneapolis Star Tribune), Kaler wrote a response, detailing many of the accomplishments of the university in reducing administrative spending and holding down tuition. In it, Kaler wrote: "The articles did not report that, despite stunning state disinvestment, the university is more productive than at any time in recent history."

Research and publications 
Kaler's research interests are in surfactant and colloid science, statistical mechanics, thermodynamics, and materials synthesis. His work has focused on complex fluids, which are characterized by changes of composition or density over length scales comparable to molecular dimensions. Examples are liquid crystals, microemulsions and micelles, some polymeric solutions, vesicles, emulsions, and protein solutions. He has supervised 37 Ph.D. students and numerous postdoctoral researchers, and has served as a consultant to numerous industrial laboratories and legal firms. Kaler is coeditor of the book Giant Micelles and is author or coauthor of more than 200 papers. He holds 10 U.S. patents.

Awards and activities 
Kaler received one of the first Presidential Young Investigator Awards from the National Science Foundation in 1984 and has received numerous awards for his research, including the American Chemical Society (ACS) Award in Colloid or Surface Chemistry in 1998. He became a fellow of both the American Association for the Advancement of Science in 2001 and the ACS in 2010. He has served in a variety of positions in several professional societies, including the leadership ladder in the ACS Division of Colloid and Surface Chemistry, of which he was chair in 2006. He was cochair of both the 1997 and 2007 Colloid Symposia, held at the University of Delaware. He has chaired or cochaired three Gordon Research Conferences. Kaler was elected a member of the U.S. National Academy of Engineering in 2010 for the elucidation of structure-function relationships in surfactant systems that has led to novel formulations of complex, self-assembled media.

Among other leadership activities, Kaler is a member of the Guthrie Theater Board, the co-chair of Generation Next — which is a community partnership committed to closing the education achievement gap — Chair of the NCAA Division I Board of Directors, and Chair of the Big Ten Council of Presidents and Chancellors.

In April 2014 Kaler was named to the American Academy of Arts and Sciences, one of the nation's most prestigious honorary societies. He was elected in two categories: for his work as a chemical engineer and as a higher education administrator.

References

External links 
 
 Eric W. Kaler biography
 Eric Kaler's UMN Department of Chemical Engineering and Materials Science faculty page

California Institute of Technology alumni
University of Minnesota College of Science and Engineering alumni
Presidents of the University of Minnesota
1956 births
Living people
Fellows of the American Association for the Advancement of Science
Members of the United States National Academy of Engineering
Minnesota CEMS